This is a list of Palatkans who are notable citizens of Palatka, Florida.

Born and raised in Palatka
The following people were born and spent a significant amount of their growing-up years in Palatka.Arleen Polite, Artist
 Clayton Beauford, professional football player
 William L. Calhoun, admiral
 James Colbert, radio show host in Orlando Florida
 Kevis Coley, professional football player
 John Crawford, author
 Bill Foster, college basketball coach
 Camellia Johnson, opera singer
 John Henry Lloyd, National Baseball Hall of Fame, 1977
 Michelle McCool, WWE retired professional wrestler, Former 2X holder of the  WWE Women's Championship (1956-2010) and Former 2X WWE Divas Champion
 Steven Douglas Merryday, judge
 Willie Offord, professional football player
 Charles Sharon, professional football player
 Jarvis Williams, professional football player
 John L. Williams, professional football player

Born elsewhere, raised in Palatka
The following people were not born in Palatka, but spent a significant amount of their growing-up years in the city.
 Omar Ahmad, Internet entrepreneur and politician
 H. M. Fearnside, businessman, politician and had served as one of the mayors of Palatka, Florida
 Isaac Guillory, folk musician
 Robert H. Jenkins, Jr., Vietnam veteran, Medal of Honor recipient
 Kelly R. Smith, congressman
 Johnny Tillotson, singer-songwriter

Born in Palatka, raised elsewhere

The following people were born in Palatka but spent most (if not all) of their growing-up years away from the city.

 Odell Barnes, entrepreneur
 Earl Leggett, professional football player
 Medwin Peek, architect
 Joseph Warren Stilwell, general
 George Tucker, jazz musician

Significant to Palatka
The following people were born and raised elsewhere, but played a significant role in the community.

 Mary McLeod Bethune, educator, founder Bethune Cookman University
 Isaac H. Bronson, judge and congressman
 Hubbard Hart, steamboat operator and hotelier
 William A. Forward, politician and judge
 William Dunn Moseley, first governor of Florida
 Slomon Moody, physician

References

Palatka
Palatka, Florida